Sandra Hanington  was the Master of the Royal Canadian Mint (President and CEO). She was appointed to this position on February 11, 2015 and resigned on July 1, 2018. She was the fourth woman to serve in this capacity. Prior to her appointment, she was a member of the Board of Directors of Canada Mortgage and Housing Corporation in 2014. She is also a recognized Canadian philanthropist, having previously served on the board of Kids Help Phone and co-founding Jack.org, a mental health organization. Hanington currently resides in Toronto with her family.

Education 

Hanington completed her Bachelor of Applied Science degree from the University of Waterloo and is a licensed professional engineer. She then went on to obtain a Master of Business Administration degree from the University of Toronto and became a certified member of the Institute of Corporate Directors through the Rotman School of Management.

Career
Hanington has a diverse background with experience in the financial industry, human resources, corporate governance, operational strategy and marketing. Prior to the Canadian Mint, she served as Vice-President of Insurance for BMO Financial Group in 1999. She has also worked for Manulife Financial, North American Life Assurance, Royal Trustco Ltd, and Suncor Inc.

Throughout her career, Hanington has served on multiple company and non-profit boards in various positions. In 2014, she was appointed to the board of directors of Canada Mortgage and House corporation and Extendicare Inc.  Prior to Extendicare Inc., she also was involved on the board of Symcor Corp. Her experience allowed her to serve as the previous board chair of Kids Help Phone and currently sits on the board of directors for Jack.org, an organization she co-founded with her husband Eric Windeler.

Hanington submitted her resignation from the Royal Canadian Mint in May 2018, citing the need to spend more time with her family. Among the highlights of her tenure with the firm involved winning the largest foreign single denomination circulation coining contract, along with the Canada 150 commemorative coin program.

Charitable work
Hanington is the co-founder of Jack.org along with her husband, Eric Windeler and still sits on the board of directors today. The charity is named after her son, Jack, who died by suicide while in his first year of studies at Queen’s University in 2010. Jack.org is aimed at students between the ages of 15 and 24. One hundred and fourteen school chapters have been started across Canada and over 75 student leaders have become certified Jack Talks speakers bringing the conversation into educational institutions, delivering more than 150 talks to more than 30,000 students a year. She also assists in the planning and execution of the Jack Summit where over 250 students from across the nation come together to learn and gain the skills needed to speak up about mental health and create engaging initiatives. Hanington raises approximately $1.6 million annually to fund the project. She has also previously served on the board of Kids Help Phone.

Recognition and awards 
For three consecutive years, beginning in 2007, Hanington was named by the Women’s Executive Network (WXN) as one of Canada’s Top 100 Most Powerful Women. and was inducted into the Hall of Fame in 2010

References

21st-century Canadian civil servants
University of Toronto alumni
University of Waterloo alumni
Royal Canadian Mint presidents
Year of birth missing (living people)
Living people